The Maulana Abul Kalam Azad Trophy, abbreviated as MAKA Trophy, is a sports honour of the Republic of India. The award is named after Abul Kalam Azad commonly referred to as Maulana Azad, one of the senior leaders of Indian independence movement and first Minister of Education in independent India. It is awarded annually by the Ministry of Youth Affairs and Sports. It is a rolling trophy awarded to the "overall top performing University in sports and promoting competitive sports in University" over the preceding year. , the award for the university securing first position comprises "a rolling MAKA trophy and a cash prize of ".

The trophy, initiated in 1956–1957, has been awarded a total of 64 times as of 2020. The objective of the trophy is to promote competitive sports, excellence in sports, and integrating sports and physical fitness amongst the Indian colleges and universities. The trophy is awarded annually with the other five National Sports Awards and national adventure award at the Presidential Palace presented by the President of India, usually on 29 August of a year. Six universities have won the trophy various times. Guru Nanak Dev University in Amritsar has won the trophy 23 times, most recently in the year 2022. Panjab University in Chandigarh has won the trophy 15 times, most recently in the year 2020, while Delhi University based in Delhi has won the trophy 14 times, most recently in the year 2000–2001. Other winners include Bombay University in Mumbai which won the inaugural trophy, Punjabi University in Patiala, and 
Kurukshetra University in Kurukshetra.

List of recipients

Reference

External links

Maulana Abul Kalam Azad Trophy at Ministry of Youth Affairs and Sports

 
Indian sports trophies and awards
Awards established in 1956
Ministry of Youth Affairs and Sports